The brown fantail (Rhipidura drownei) is a species of bird in the family Rhipiduridae.
It is found in Bougainville Island and Guadalcanal.

Description 
Not big (from 9-10 up to 14 cm long) dark bird with a long tail, which it often spreads like a fan. 

The main color of the plumage is brown, which is reflected in the English name of this species. The main color of the plumage is brown, which is reflected in the English name of this species. Upperparts - greyish-brown, underparts somewhat lighter, gray with an ocher tint and a faint white streak. The wings are brown above, the tail is light brown. The chest and head are greyish. On the head above the eye - a white stripe - "eyebrow"  Sometimes there is also  a light strip under the eye. Iris is dark brown. The beak is black or greyish brown, with a paler base underneath. The neck is whitish-gray. Legs are brownish gray.

Males and females are rather similar, but females are somewhat smaller. Juveniles are also similar to adults, but their plumage is duller and lacks the white markings on the head and throat; the rufous color on the wings and tail is paler.

The nest is small cup-shaped with a very small hanging tail. All the construction is entwined with cobwebs. It is built at a height of about 2 m above the ground in a fork of a horizontal branch.

The voice is like a weak but piercing ringing whistle.

Habitat and Behavior 

Brown fantail inhabits mountain forests at an altitude of more than 700 meters above sea level  (adults are usually above 900 m) and at least up to 1600 m. Below 700 m, the Brown fantail is replaced by Rufous fantail (R. rufifrons).

They feed on all tiers of the forest, catching insects on the fly or looking them out  from the foliage. May join mixed-species flocks for foraging.

Taxonomy 

According to IOC there are 2  recognised subspecies. In alphabetical order, these are:

 R. d. drownei	Mayr, 1931 — inhabits in еру mountains of Bougainville Island.
 R. d. ocularis	Mayr, 1931 — inhabits in еру mountains of Guadalcanal.

Brown fantail (R. drownei) forms a superspecies with: 
 Makira fantail (R. tenebrosa)
 Rennell fantail (R. rennelliana)
 Streaked fantail (R. verreauxi)
 Kadavu fantail (R. personata)
 Samoan fantail (R. nebulosa)

References

brown fantail
Birds of Bougainville Island
Birds of Guadalcanal
brown fantail
Taxonomy articles created by Polbot